Centerpoint Mall (formerly Towne and Countrye Square) is a shopping mall located in Toronto, Ontario, Canada on the southwest corner of Steeles Avenue and Yonge Street at the boundary of Toronto.

History

Centerpoint Mall was known as Towne and Countrye Square at its grand opening in the 1960s as an enclosed mall, until the name change to its present name in 1990. In 1966, the mall began operation with anchors Sayvette, Miracle Mart, and Super City Discount Foods. The Super City (later Loblaws) store was torn down and rebuilt as a two-storey Zellers. The Bay was added adjacent to Yonge Street in April 1974.  The Sayvette chain went defunct in 1975 and was converted to Woolco. Woolco closed and the store and was converted to Super Centre, then to Loblaws, then to No Frills. Miracle Mart was converted to Canadian Tire. The Zellers was closed in 2012 when the Zellers leasehold was purchased by Target; the location was closed for about a year before reopening as Target on 19 March 2013. In early 2015, all Target stores across Canada closed. A Lowe's home improvement store opened in the former Target store in late November 2016, but it had closed by the end of February 2019. A Canada Computers store has now been open since December 14, 2019 in the former Lowe's store.
With  of retail space, it is one of the largest malls in Toronto.

On 9 December 2021, an application was submitted to the city to permit the re-development of the property. It is planned to demolish the mall over several years, with the aim of replacing it with "[a] network of new public and private streets and development blocks containing a mix of uses including residential, retail, office, a central public park, and privately-owned publicly accessible spaces".

See also
 List of shopping malls in Toronto
 List of shopping malls in Canada

References

Shopping malls in Toronto
North York
Shopping malls established in 1960
1960 establishments in Ontario